Numerous plants have been introduced to West Virginia in the United States, and many of them have become invasive species.

Invasive plants 
The following are some of invasive plant species established in West Virginia:

See also
List of trees naturalized in West Virginia
Invasive species in the United States

References

External links
USDA PLANTS Database USDA database showing county distribution of plant species in the US
InvasiveSpecies.gov Information from the US National Invasive Species Council

Naturalized trees
Environment of West Virginia
Natural history of West Virginia
West Virginia
Invasive plant